Evixion is a 1986 Canadian docudrama film produced and directed by Bashar Shbib. The film is about the tenants of a dilapidated  apartment building in Montreal who receive an eviction notice and have to deal with the possibility of being homeless. The cast includes Roland Smith, Claire Nadon, Kennon Raines, Pierre Curzi, Piotr Lysak and Jean-Claude Gingras.  It was criticized for its lack of a proper plot or purpose. It was first released on 26 August 1968 at the World Film Festival in Montreal.

References

External links 
 

1986 films
Canadian docudrama films
English-language Canadian films
Films directed by Bashar Shbib
1980s English-language films
1980s Canadian films